Charles Endell Esquire is a British comedy-drama series that is a spin-off of the series Budgie, with the role of Endell continuing to be played by Iain Cuthbertson.  Due to an ITV technicians' strike which took the network completely off the air for three months, the first two episodes were broadcast in 1979 and the remaining episodes were not aired until a full repeat of the series began on 26 April 1980 on almost all ITV regions, except Southern Television (which started it on 1 May 1980) and Westward Television (which never broadcast the series).  Only six episodes were made.

Plot
Charles Endell was sent to prison for ten years after the last episode of Budgie. The show starts with Charlie Endell returning to his native Glasgow after serving seven years (with three off for good behaviour).  He plans to re-establish himself in Glasgow after his former business empire in London was broken up by the vice squad.

Back in Glasgow, he visits his solicitor, Archibald Telfer, to acquire his "rainy day" cash.  Archibald Telfer apparently dies and the money disappears, but Charlie is convinced that the death has been faked.

Episode list
 1: Glasgow Belongs To Me
 2: As One Door Closes Another Slams in Your Face
 3: Slaughter on Piano Street
 4: The Moon Shines Bright on Charlie Endell.
 5: Stuff Me a Flamingo
 6: If You Can't Join 'Em, Beat 'Em

Cast
 Charles Endell Esq – Iain Cuthbertson
 Hamish McIntyre Jr – Tony Osoba
 Alastair Vint – Rikki Fulton
 Det Sgt Dickson – Phil McCall
 Janet – Julie Ann Fullarton
 Kate Moncrieff – Rohan McCullough
 Dixie – Annie Ross

DVD release
A DVD of the series was planned for release on 22 February 2016, with a 12 certificate rating. The release would soon be cancelled, with the distributor opting instead for a digital download release at £4.99 per episode.

References

External links

1970s British drama television series
1980s British drama television series
1979 British television series debuts
1980 British television series endings
ITV television dramas
Scottish television shows
Television shows produced by Scottish Television
British comedy-drama television shows
English-language television shows
British television spin-offs